Brian Woodward  (9 May 1952 – 13 November 2022) was a former motorcycle speedway rider in National League (speedway) and British League.

Career

Woodward was born on 9 May 1952 in Monmouth, Wales.

He appeared on the front cover of the Speedway Star 25 August 1973 with teammate Mike Broadbank.
Although born a Welshman, Brian Woodward rode for Young England against a Young Czechoslovakia team in 1974 in an almost whitewash test series, England winning 5.5 -1.5.  Brian rode in only one test, at Birmingham (Perry Barr).

1975 saw him riding as a Weymouth Wizards under promoter Harry Davis (father of John Davis). When he returned in 1979 it was as a Weymouth Wildcats with new promoter Len Silver.

In 1979, in the Sunday Mirror World Championship Qualifying Round at Boston, he picked up 11 points from 5 rides, finishing fifth.
He finished his career at Oxford. 

Woodward died on 13 November 2022.

References

External links

 https://www.edinburghmonarchs.co.uk/match-centre/fixture/1977-09-14/newport/edinburgh
 http://www.internationalspeedway.co.uk/engvczsl2.htm 
 http://www.speedwayplus.com/weymouth_wildcats.shtml
 http://edinburghspeedway.blogspot.com/2014/06/national-league-riders-championship-1977.html

1952 births
2022 deaths
British speedway riders
Newport Wasps riders
Oxford Cheetahs riders
Sportspeople from Monmouth, Wales